Adjutant Maxime Albert Lenoir (22 December 1888 – 25 October 1916) was a pioneering World War I flying ace credited with eleven confirmed aerial victories, as well as eight unconfirmed.

Biography

Early life

Maxime Albert Lenoir was born on 22 December 1888 in Chargé, France. Lenoir trained as a pilot in 1913, receiving a civilian Pilot's Brevet, No. 1564, on 5 December. He was already a pilot when World War I began.

Aerial service

The start of World War I saw Lenoir mobilized for military service. He applied for a transfer to aviation duty. He completed his military aviation training, receiving Military Pilot's Brevet No. 641, and after a few weeks delay, was assigned to Escadrille 18 to fly a Caudron. He downed an Aviatik on 5 June 1915, and became a balloon buster on the 15th. Lenoir then trained on single-seaters, and was posted to fly a Nieuport fighter with Escadrille 23 in early 1916. He scored his first fighter victory on 16 March 1916, and added eight more by 25 September, including shares with Jean Casale and Georges Lachmann. He was wounded twice that year, by shrapnel on 9 August and in aerial combat on 25 September.

On the latter occasion, he was flying his new SPAD VII fighter. Lenoir was one of the first French fliers to be issued the new fighter. He was wounded while attacking a German three-seater that he shot down. It was his 11th and final confirmed victory.

To the SPAD VII's ordinary markings, Lenoir added his initials on the left rim of the cockpit above a black silhouette of a man's head. Emblazoned down the fuselage's side was the slogan Trompe le Mort (Deceives death) and the numerals '111'.

Maxime Albert Lenoir was killed in action on 25 October 1916.

Honors and awards

Chevalier de la Légion d'honneur

Adjudant pilot of Escadrille N23. Pursuit pilot beyond compare, setting the highest example of energy and self-sacrifice. During eleven months of uninterrupted service in his Escadrille, he has had 91 successful combats, returning frequently with his plane riddled by bullets. He downed his sixth enemy plane on 4 August 1916. (Chevalier de la Légion d'honneur citation, 9 August 1916)

Médaille militaire

Maréchal-des-logis pilot of Escadrille N23. Non-commissioned officer always demonstrating the best fighting spirit during the course of his numerous combats, more often behind enemy lines than behind our own. In all his actions he showed contempt for death. On 15 March 1916, while protecting a long distance reconnaissance and having his machine gun jam during the course of a combat, he completed his mission and managed to ward off enemy planes by a series of audacious maneuvers. He returned with his plane riddled by bullets. (Médaille militaire citation, 15 March 1916)

He also won the Croix de Guerre with eight Palmes.

Sources of information

References
 Nieuport Aces of World War 1. Norman Franks. Osprey Publishing, 2000. , .
 Over the Front: A Complete Record of the Fighter Aces and Units of the United States and French Air Services, 1914-1918. Norman L. R. Franks, Frank W. Bailey. Grub Street, 1992. , .
 Spad VII Aces of World War I. Jon Guttman. Osprey Publishing, 2001. , .

External links
  Contains a reproduction of Lenoir's aircraft markings.

1888 births
1916 deaths
French World War I flying aces
People from Indre-et-Loire
French military personnel killed in World War I
Chevaliers of the Légion d'honneur
Recipients of the Croix de Guerre 1914–1918 (France)